Ahenema is a traditional, royal slipper worn by the queens and chiefs of the Akan, Ga, and Ewe ethnic groups in Ghana. In recent times, this traditional slipper came to be worn by anyone to events such as festivals, funerals, wedding ceremonies and church.

History 
In the past, Ahenema was worn strictly by people of royal descent, and was often named after the king. The method of naming was later changed and the Ahemema was named after the children of the king. This was because the kings' name should not be mentioned in vain, hence the name Ahenema, which translates as king's children. The slipper used to be made of wood and rope but now it's made of leather. The number 8 is carved into the sole of an Ahenema slipper as it represents stability.

Types 
There are basically two types of Ahenema. The first is the "Asansan tuo", which has a curved shape, and the other is the "Atine", which has a straight shape and is mostly worn by chiefs.

References 

Akan culture
African clothing